The Phantom of the Operetta (Spanish: El Fantasma de la opereta) is a 1960 Mexican comedy film directed by Fernando Cortés and starring Germán Valdés, Ana Luisa Peluffo and Luis Aldás. A man and his girlfriend take over a run-down theatre, planning to stage musical shows there. However the place soon turns out to be haunted. The title is a reference to The Phantom of the Opera.

Cast
 Germán Valdés as Aldo / Baldomiro Valdes  
 Ana Luisa Peluffo as Lucy  
 Luis Aldás as Sen~or Marcucci  
 Marcelo Chávez as Sen~or Lopez  
 Famie Kaufman as Gertrudis la flaca  
 Antonio Brillas as Juan  
 Julián de Meriche as Vladimir  
 Armando Sáenz as De Ramos, crítico teatral  
 Eduardo Alcaraz as Don Quique  
 Francisco Reiguera as Jeremias 
 José Pardavé as Policía  
 Manuel 'Loco' Valdés 
 Jorge Zamora 
 Ramón Valdés as Policia  
 Guillermo Hernández as Policía
 Manuel Alcón

References

Bibliography 
 Joanne Hershfield & David R. Maciel. Mexico's Cinema: A Century of Film and Filmmakers. Rowman & Littlefield, 1999.

External links 
 

1960 films
1960 comedy films
Mexican comedy films
1960s Spanish-language films
Films directed by Fernando Cortés
1960s Mexican films